Life thru a Lens is the debut solo studio album by English singer-songwriter Robbie Williams. It was Williams' first solo album following his departure from Take That. Released on 29 September 1997 through Chrysalis Records, it is influenced by Britpop, a departure from the poppier tone of music Take That employed. The album's working name was The Show-Off Must Go On.

The album's first three singles, "Old Before I Die", "Lazy Days" and "South of the Border" (the only single to miss the top 10), were all moderate successes, but it was the fourth single "Angels" which catapulted Williams to international fame as a solo artist. Peaking at number 4, it has sold over 1 million copies in the UK and is his biggest-selling single to date. Fifth and final single "Let Me Entertain You" reached number three, becoming the album's third top-5 hit. "Freedom," Robbie's first solo success, a cover of George Michael's 1990 hit, is not featured on the album.

Life thru a Lens debuted at number 11 on the UK Albums Chart and initially remained in the lower regions, but, upon the chart success of "Angels", it began steadily climbing and finally reached number one in April 1998, five months after its release. Though never selling more than 60,000 copies in a single week, the album has sold over 2,094,000 copies as of November 2013, making it Williams' fourth-best-selling studio album and fifth-best-seller overall.

Recording and music
After trying hard to find his own sound during a period of personal upheaval, Williams began recordings for the album at London's Maison Rouge studios in March 1997, shortly after his introduction to Guy Chambers. The title track, "Life thru a Lens" was written about his then girlfriend Jacqueline Hampton-Smith who was a socialite. It is often mistakenly attributed to Tara Palmer Tompkinson, but they did not date until 2006. "Ego a Go Go" was written about Gary Barlow, "South of the Border" discusses Kate Moss, and "Baby Girl Window" was inspired by Samantha Beckinsale and her late father, actor Richard Beckinsale. "One of God's Better People" and "Angels" were inspired by Williams' mother, Jan. Hidden track "Hello, Sir" is a poem that takes a dig at one of Williams' former teachers. Williams reprised part of the poem on the 1 Giant Leap song "My Culture".

The sound of the album is influenced by Britpop, especially bands such as Oasis, a direction his former Take That bandmate Mark Owen had also chosen to pursue on his debut album Green Man (1996). John Bush of AllMusic said that Life thru a Lens "continually betrays overt influences from Oasis and other Britpop stars, but triumphs nevertheless due to gorgeous production, Williams' irresistible personality, and the overall flavor of outrageous, utterly enjoyable pop music."

Critical reception

Writing for Melody Maker in October 1997, Robin Bresnark gave Life thru a Lens a negative review; "There's nothing here... sure, Robbie Williams is as fascinating a hapless goon as we're ever likely to come across. But this album feels more like a press release than an album – and that's not what I call music." However, John Bush of AllMusic was very positive in his four and a half stars out of five review, calling the album "excellent" and "one of the best U.K. debuts of the '90s".

Q ranked the album at number 43 in their 2004 list of "The 50 (+50) Best British Albums Ever" and in their unordered 2005 list of the "Ultimate Music Collection". Record Collector included the album in their unordered 2000 list of "10 Classic Albums from 21 Genres for the 21st Century", whilst Robert Dimery included the album in the book 1001 Albums You Must Hear Before You Die.

Commercial performance
The album was released in October 1997, not long after Williams's stint in rehab. The album was launched with his first live solo gig at the Élysée Montmartre in Paris. At first, the album was slow to take off, debuting at number 11 on the UK Albums Chart, and falling to 104 not long after release, having sold a little over 30,000 copies. The album reached the number one position after spending 27 weeks on the chart, as a consequence of the huge success of the "Angels" single, boosting the album's sales to 300,000. The album spent a total of 218 weeks on the chart and two weeks at number one, becoming the 58th best selling album of all time with sales of 2.4 million copies. Despite the album's success in Williams' homeland, it failed to make a bigger impact in the international market. However, in Argentina, the album reached the top ten in early 1998. The album has sold more than 4 million copies worldwide. The album has been certified as 8× Platinum in the UK.

Singles
 "Old Before I Die", a track co-written by Williams, Eric Bazilian, and Desmond Child, was released as the album's lead single in April 1997, peaking at #2 on the UK Singles Chart. The song failed to make an impact in other international charts.
 "Lazy Days" was released as the album's second single in the summer of 1997, amidst Williams' battle with addiction. He was allowed to check out from rehab to shoot the video for the song. The single charted at number-eight in the United Kingdom but, because promotion was nonexistent, struggled to reach the top forty of any other European chart.
 "South of the Border" was released as the album's third single in September 1997. It failed to make a significant impact on the UK Singles Chart, peaking at #14, and as such, many saw this as the end of Williams' solo career.
 "Angels", a song penned by Williams and Guy Chambers, was released as the album's fourth single. The decision to release the song came after Williams met the record company to discuss concerns about his future. The single was released in December 1997, soon becoming Williams' best selling-single in the United Kingdom, being certified 2× Platinum by the BPI. The song became a hit around Europe and Latin America and sold almost two million copies worldwide, rocketing sales of his album.
 "Let Me Entertain You" was released as the album's fifth and final single in March 1998. It peaked at #3 on the UK Singles Chart, becoming one of Williams' signature songs and being the opening song for most of Williams' concerts throughout his career.

Track listing

Personnel
 Robbie Williams – vocals, backing vocals
 Guy Chambers – keyboards, guitar, backing vocals
 Chris Sharrock – drums, snare
 Andy Duncan – percussion
 Martin Slattery – keyboards
 Mark Feltham – harmonica
 Gary Nuttall – guitar, backing vocals
 Steve Power – keyboards, programming
 Geoff Dugmore – drums, percussion
 Steve Bush – programming
 Derek Watkins – trumpet
 Fil Eisler – guitar, bass guitar, tom-tom
 Mark Smith – bass guitar, programming
 Oscar O'Loughlin – guitar
 Mark Smith – guitar, programming
 Steve Sidwell – trumpet
 Chester Kamen – guitar
 Steve “Smiley” Barnard – drums, backing vocals
 Dave Catlin-Birch – bass guitar, backing vocals
 Kerry Hopwood – programming
 André Barreau – guitar, backing vocals
 Beverley Skeete – backing vocals
 Carroll Thompson – backing vocals
 Andy Caine – backing vocals
 Claudia Fontaine – backing vocals
 Nicole Patterson – backing vocals

Charts and certifications

Weekly charts

 Finland's peak was at midprice-chart.

Year-end charts

Certifications

References

1997 debut albums
Robbie Williams albums
Britpop albums
EMI Records albums